Kafr El Sheikh Governorate is one of the governorates of Egypt. It lies in the northern part of the country, along the western branch of the Nile in the Nile Delta. Its capital is the city of Kafr El Sheikh.

Kafr El Sheikh is the first nationwide in the cultivation of long-staple cotton for export.

Overview
Kafr El Sheikh Governorate, which was once part of the Gharbia Governorate, was created in 1949. It was originally named Fuadiyah in honor of King Fuad I of Egypt. After the 1952 Revolution and the subsequent abolition of the monarchy, the governorate took the name of its capital city Kafr El Sheikh. This name, adopted in 1955, means "the village of the chief".

The area occupied today by the Kafr El Sheikh Governorate encompasses the ancient region of Bashmur and has been inhabited since ancient times and so it has a noteworthy number of archaeological sites, at Tell Metoubes, Fuwwah, Desouk, Tell Qabrit, and other settlements around Lake Burrulus. The capital of Lower Egypt, called "Buto", is located at present-day Tell El Faraain (the Hill of the Pharaohs), near Desouk.

Municipal divisions
The governorate is divided into municipal divisions, with a total estimated population as of July 2017 of 3,376,809. In some instances there is a markaz and a kism with the same name.

Population
According to population estimates, in 2015 the majority of residents in the governorate lived in rural areas, with an urbanization rate of only 23.1%. Out of an estimated 3,172,753 people residing in the governorate, 2,441,246 people lived in rural areas as opposed to only 731,507 in urban areas.

Cities and towns
Lake Burullus is located in the north of the Kafr El Sheikh governorate. The following are in Kafr El Sheikh:
 El Hamool
 Baltim
 Biyala
 Desouk
 Fuwwah
 Kafr El Sheikh
 Metoubes
 Qallin
 El Reyad
 Sidi Salem

Industrial zones
According to the Egyptian Governing Authority for Investment and Free Zones (GAFI), in affiliation with the Ministry of Investment (MOI), the following industrial zones are located in this governorate:
Balteem 
Metobas 
Industrial Zone in "mlaha of Moneisi"

Projects and programs
In 2016, Switzerland committed to funding a solid waste management program in Kafr El Sheikh, a project with the Egyptian Ministry of Environment that will conclude in 2021. The National Solid Waste Management Programme (NSWMP) involves the construction of infrastructure for new as well as the expansion and improvement of existing waste treatment, landfill, and recycling facilities.

Economy
Industries include cotton-processing factories, rice and fishing. Kafr Elsheikh is also home to one of the biggest sugar factories in the region.

Education
Kafr El Sheikh University comprises faculties for medicine , commerce, engineering, agriculture, veterinary medicine, arts, physical education, science, education, special education, dentistry, physical therapy, alsun and pharmacy.

Notable persons
 Hamdeen Sabahi
 Mohamed Atta
 Ahmed Zewail
 Saad Zaghloul
 Mamdouh Elssbiay

References

External links
 El Watan News of Kafr El Sheikh Governorate
 UNDP Kafr ash Shaykh Human Development Index Indicator's page

 
Governorates of Egypt
Nile Delta
1949 establishments in Egypt